Therese Maher is a camogie player, and winner of Five All Star awards 2005, 2008, 2009 and 2011 and 2013. 

She finally got an All-Ireland Medal in 2013 after 16 years when her team defeated Kilkenny in the final 1-09 to 0-07 points. She plays for her club, Athenry. She was also a member of the Galway senior panel that unsuccessfully contested the All Ireland finals of 2010 and 2011 against Wexford. She was Galway camogie player of the year 1998 and 2008 and a member of the Team of the Championship for 2011. She was also an All-Star nominee in 2010.

Other awards
Two All Ireland Minor championships 1996 and 1997, Two Gael Linn Cup 2000 and 2008, One National League, Galway Camogie Player of the Year, Two Kilmacud sevens in 2005 and 2007, One Ashbourne Shield, One National Camogie League 2005, Four Senior Club County titles. Therese Maher scored 1-3 in the 2009 Club Semi-Final
She captained the Irish team in the 2004 centenary internationals. She featured in a programme dedicated to camogie in the BBC Blue Peter series in 2001.

References

External links
 Profile in Cúl4kidz magazine
 Official Camogie Website
 Galway Camogie website
 |Review of 2009 championship in On The Ball Official Camogie Magazine
 Reports of 2008 All Ireland final in  Independent, Irish Times and  Examiner,
 Fixtures and results for the 2009 O'Duffy Cup
 All-Ireland Senior Camogie Championship: Roll of Honour
 Video highlights from Galway’s 2009 championship matches against  Kilkenny and  Wexford.
 Video highlights of 2009 championship Part One and part two
 Video highlights of 2008 championshiup Part One,  Part Two and Part three
 Video of 2008 All Ireland finals preview
 Video of 2008 All Ireland semi-final Wexford v Galway

Year of birth missing (living people)
Living people
Galway camogie players
Place of birth missing (living people)